Medek (feminine Medková) is a Czech surname. Notable people include:
 Emila Medková, Czech photographer
 Ivan Medek, Czech classical music critic
 Mikuláš Medek, Czech painter
 Rudolf Medek, Czech poet
 Tilo Medek, German composer

Czech-language surnames